The Presidential Escort Group "Granaderos de Tarqui" (Spanish: Grupo de Caballería
Escolta Presidencial "Granaderos de Tarqui") is the President of Ecuador's honour guard service regiment, which protects the Carondelet Palace in Quito. Granaderos de Tarqui, means Tarqui Grenadiers in Spanish.

Background 
The history of the Granaderos dates from the era of independence revolutions in Latin America. The Granaderos have their origin in the troops commanded by Marshal Antonio José de Sucre who was responsible for the Ecuadorian victory in the Battle of Pichincha in 1822, which effectively sealed the independence of Ecuador from Spain. These troops also participated in the Battle of Tarqui on February 27, 1829, in the provinces of Azuay and Loja. The Grenadiers trace thus its heritage from the Ecuadorian cavalrymen of the cavalry regiments of the Gran Colombia Army who fought with Simón Bolívar and José de San Martín during this period of struggle for independence. Later in the 19th century, the Government Palace of Quito was beginning to be guarded by Army units, which had their headquarters in the nearby building of the former colonial battalion Real de Lima. Despite this, they never served permanently as Ecuadorian presidents have historically never had a permanent bodyguard until that point. 

On January 25, 1919, the 1st Cavalry Group was first organized as Presidential Escort, which remained in effect until 1940. On October 31, 1952, by executive order of President José María Velasco Ibarra, a reform of army units was carried out, with the escort having more of a public role. In 1987, then President León Febres Cordero published a ministerial resolution on the unit, officially giving it the honorary title "Tarqui Grenadiers", in honor of the troopers who perished during the namesake battle. Under the government of Rafael Correa, the Presidential Military House and the Presidential Air Transport Squadron in the Presidential Protection Service were merged, and attached to the Presidency of the Republic. Correa also decreed that the ceremony of Guard Mounting is to be held every Monday in the Plaza de la Independencia of Quito, open to the public and in the presence of the President and other dignitaries of the State.

Functions 
The regiment has the following roles in its service:

Provide honors for the President of Ecuador
Take part in the changing of the guard at the Carondelet Palace
Provide honors for Heads of State during official visits to Quito
Provide honors for deceased leaders and figures
Raise and lower the national flag at  the Government Palace.

Composition 
 Headquarters Company
 Presidential Mounted Ceremonial Squadron
 1st Squadron
 2nd Squadron
 Mounted fanfare band
 Presidential Band
 Drill Team Company

Uniform 
Their regimental uniform is of French influence and was worn by soldiers who fought with Antonio José de Sucre in the Latin American wars of independence and specifically in the Battle of Tarqui. It consists of a shako made of blue cloth with tricolor plume and the state emblem towards the front,a blue jacket with neck and rigid sleeves lined with red cloth, epaulettes, white denim pants, and black boots. The regiment also wears white suede gloves during its public duties. Officers carry a steel sword with a lion's head hilt and gilded gilt on the fire and carved in high relief, while the regiment's NCOs carry a lance with a tricolor pennant when they march on horseback and on foot.

Gallery

See also 
 Guard of honour
 President of Ecuador
 Armed Forces of Ecuador
 Carondelet Palace

External links

 ESCOLTA PRESIDENCIAL, "Lealtad hasta el sacrificio" de www.presidencia.gob.ec
 El uniforme de los Granaderos de Tarqui es el único vigente. 
 Así se forma un granadero de Tarqui.
 El Relevo de Guardia de Presidencial es una tradición que enorgullece a los Granaderos de Tarqui.
 Las mujeres de la banda militar de Carondelet

References 

Military of Ecuador
Guards of honour
Grenadier regiments